Novembar (Serbian Cyrillic: Новембар; trans. November) is a Serbian punk rock band from Niš.

History

Studeni Studeni, band formation (1986–1991)
During the late 1980s, one of the most promising former Yugoslav bands from Zagreb, Studeni Studeni (trans. Cold November), were formed in 1986. The band recorded only an EP, Čisto kao suza (Bright as a Teardrop), released in 1990, before disbanding in the early 1990s, due to the outbreak of the Yugoslav wars. The band's frontman, guitarist and vocalist Goran Kostić moved to Niš, during the Summer of 1991, and immediately started playing bass guitar in a band called Glas Amerike. A month later, Kostić switched to guitar, and the band changed the name to Novembar (November), consisting of Kostić, guitarist Aleksandar Đokić, drummer Goran Savić, and bassist Toni Kostadinov.

Nationwide breakthrough, disbandment (1992)
The following year, the band performed at Palilula Culture Olympics in Belgrade as guests, as Studeni Studeni won the festival the previous year. The band also performed at the Niš club Underground and the Belgrade KST. At the time, the band changed the lineup: bassist Zoran Ranđelović, who previously played with a number of Karlovac bands, including the Boris Novković's Noćna Straža, replaced Kostadinov, drummer Savić switched to guitar, and the new drummer became Zoran Vidaković.

The band recorded their debut album Deguelo, released in 1994, featuring guest appearance by Milan Mladenović, who played the guitar solo for the track "Gledaj kako ljubav umire" ("Watch as Love Is Dying"), a song from the Studeni Studeni period. The album was entirely written by Kostić except for the tracks "Rođendan" ("Birthday"), written by Zvonko Karanović, and "Ja sam je volio" ("I Used to Love Her"), written by the Zagreb rock band Sin Albert guitarist Denis Romac. The album, recorded at the Belgrade Go Go Studio, was released by the independent record label No Man's Land, founded by the band themselves with the poet Zvonko Karanović and Milan Jelenković. The song "Irena" ("Irene") from the album appeared on the B92 various artists compilation Radio Utopia (B92: 1989–1994) in 1994.

The band promoted the material with the appearances at the Urban Rock festival, held in Skopje, Republic of Macedonia, with the bands from Croatia, Albania, Slovenia and Greece, the No Man's Land festival in Niš, performing with the bands Suns (from Skopje), Blind (from Netherlands), KBO! (from Kragujevac), Obojeni Program (from Novi Sad) and Džukele (from Subotica), and the performance at the Belgrade club Prostor, in September 1994. The following year, the band continued their concert activities, playing across Serbia, including the Aranđelovac alternative rock festival FAR, with the bands Goblini, Block Out, and Atheist Rap.

In August 1996, the band entered the Go Go Studio to record their second album, released by B92. Blues južne pruge (Southern Railway Blues), produced by Kostić, featured cover versions of "Baby, baby" by the Niš band Fleke, and "Mjesto pod Suncem" ("A Spot under the Sun") by the Zagreb band Zvijezde. The album also featured the song "Posle svega kiša" ("After Everything, Rain"), for which the song lyrics were written by Zvonko Karanović. During 1996, the band performed at the ZGAGA rock festival at Hotič pri Litji near Ljubljana in Slovenia, with the bands KUD Idijoti, Majke and Goblini. The band also performed at the Zaječar Gitarijada festival.

The third album, Licem prema zemlji (Face towards the Ground), released in 2000, produced by Marinko Vukomanović, featured guest appearances by the Atheist Rap members Vladimir Radusinović "Radule" and Zoran Lekić "Leki" on backing vocals. The album was recorded by a new lineup including new guitarist Saša Jablanović, drummer Dragan Stojiljković, rhythm guitarist Bojan Ranđelović, and bassist Milan Stanimirović. In 2002, the band participated the Milan Mladenović tribute album Kao da je bilo nekad... Posvećeno Milanu Mladenoviću (As if It Had Happened Sometime... (Dedicated to Milan Mladenović)) with the cover version of the track "O, O, O...", originally released on the Šarlo Akrobata album Bistriji ili tuplji čovek biva kad... (Brighter or Dumber a Man Becomes When...). During the same year, Novembar disbanded.

Reformation (2005–present) 
In 2005, the band reunited, consisting of Goran Kostić (bass guitar, vocals), Aleksandar Đokić (guitar), Bojan Ranđelović (guitar), and Milan Vidaković (drums), having their first performance since the reformation at the Nisomnija festival held at the Niš Fortress. In 2006, the band appeared on the Pankrti tribute album Pankrti 06 with the cover version of the song "Kdo so ti ljudje" ("Who Are These People"), originally released on Pankrti 1983 album Svoboda '82 (Freedom '82). The song, with the previously released cover versions of "O, O, O...", "Baby, baby", and "Mjesto pod Suncem" appeared on the cover album Radulizam (Radulism, named after the Atheist Rap member Vladimir Radusinović "Radule"), released in 2008 by Studentski kulturni centar Novi Sad. The album also featured cover versions of songs by Petar i Zli Vuci, Termiti, La Strada, Azra and KBO!. Originally intending to include the cover version of Prljavo Kazalište song "Neka te ništa ne brine" ("May Nothing Make You Worry"), the band did not get the approval to release it, so the track was left out of the release.

In 2007, the band released the compilation Ko je Sunce ubio (Who Killed the Sun), featuring the material from the Studeni Studeni period and the unreleased Novembar demo and live recordings. In 2009, Multimedia Records released a live various artists compilation Groovanje devedesete uživo featuring the band's song "Irena", recorded live at the Belgrade club Prostor on 2 September 1994. The band celebrated their 20th anniversary with two concerts in Niš club Feedback, on 19 and 20 January 2012. The concerts featured guest appearances by 14 bands, including Atheist Rap, Grandpa Candys, Grupa Tvog Života, and others. Every band, beside their own songs, performed a song by Novembar as a tribute to them.

In March 2013, Novembar released their fifth studio album, entitled Proklet (Damned One). The album was produced by Nenad Pejčić and released by the Cultural Centre of Novi Sad. In the autumn of 2014, the tribute album to Novembar, entitled Tako mlad i tako čist (So Young and So Clean), was released. The album featured covers of Novembar songs recorded by Atheist Rap, Zvoncekova Bilježnica, KBO! and other acts.

In February 2015, the members of the band announced that they are working on a new studio album. The band celebrated their 25th anniversary on the festival 5 do 100 (5 to 100), which was held on 4 July 2016 at Niš Fortress. The festival featured Novembar, the band Van Gogh celebrating their 30th anniversary, and the band Galija, celebrating their 40th anniversary (the combined "age" of the bands was 95, thus the title of the festival). In the autumn of 2016 the band participated in the tribute album to KUD Idijoti entitled Za tebe — A Tribute to KUD Idijoti (For You — A Tribute to KUD Idijoti) with a cover of KUD Idijoti song "Baj, baj, bejbe" (transliteration for "Bye, Bye, Baby"). In March 2017, Novembar released the single "Magla" ("The Fog"), recorded with singer-songwriter Nikola Vranjković, as an announcement of their new studio album.

On 30 June 2017 Goran Kostić died in Niš. He was 51 years old. Two weeks later, the rest of the members held their previously announced concert at Rock in Niš festival in honor of Kostić. At the same time they released the song "Sve zaboravljam" ("I'm Forgetting Everything"), recorded before Kostić's death, stating that the album the band was working on before Kostić died would be released.

Discography

Studio albums 
Deguelo (1994)
Blues južne pruge (1996)
Licem prema zemlji (2000)
Radulizam (2008)
Proklet (2013)
Novembar (2019)

Extended plays 
Čisto kao suza (as Studeni Studeni, 1990)

Compilation albums 
Ko je Sunce ubio (2007)

Singles 
"Irena" (1994)
"O, O, O..." (2002)
"Kdo so ti ljudje" (2006)
"Irena" (2009)

See also 
 Punk rock in Yugoslavia

References 

 EX YU ROCK enciklopedija 1960–2006, Janjatović Petar; 
 Enciklopedija niškog Rock 'n' Rolla 1962 – 2000, Stanojević Vladan;

External links 
 Novembar at Myspace
 Novembar at Facebook
 Novembar at Discogs
 Novembar at YouTube
 Novembar at Last.fm

Serbian rock music groups
Serbian punk rock groups
Serbian power pop groups
Musical groups from Niš
Musical groups established in 1992
Musical groups disestablished in 2002
Musical groups reestablished in 2005